Tooth Tunes is a discontinued line of children's toothbrushes released by the Tiger Electronics division of Hasbro in 2007. Each brush played a two-minute song clip from a particular artist to encourage the user to brush their teeth for the dentist-recommended two minutes. A single toothbrush came with one song, and had a manufacturer's suggested retail price of US$9.99. Two more types, Turbo Tooth Tunes and Tooth Tunes Junior, were introduced in 2008. In 2012, nine new Tooth Tunes toothbrushes were introduced.

Once activated, a small CPU in the handle played the featured song on the chip by transferring vibrations through the bristles, which acted as transducers, into the front teeth, through the jawbone, and into the inner ear. During use, the user heard a mix between a natural vocal hum and the song being played. The intended result was for the music only to be audible to its user, however the music emanating from the toothbrush could be heard by those nearby, with increasing volume as pressure was applied to the brush head.

References

External links
 Official Hasbro Tooth Tunes page(Archive)

Dental equipment
Products introduced in 2007
Audio storage
2007 in music
Hasbro brands